Lanz is the surname of the following people:
Albrecht Lanz (1898–1942), German military commander
Alfred Lanz (1847–1907), Swiss painter and sculptor
 Austin William Lanz (1994-2021), American killer and perpetrator of 2021 Pentagon knife attack
Christian Lanz (born 1977), Mexican-American voice actor
Christoph Lanz (born 1959), German TV personality
David Lanz (born 1950), American musician
Heinrich Lanz (1838–1905), German  entrepreneur and engineer
 Hubert Lanz (1896–1982), German military commander 
 Jörg Lanz von Liebenfels (1874–1954), Austrian monk and right-winged publisher of racial theories
José María Lanz (1764–1839), Spanish-Mexican mathematician and engineer
Juan Lanz (born 1932), Mexican swimmer
 Laureano Vallenilla Lanz (1870–1936), Venezuelan philosopher
 Markus Lanz (born 1969), Italian news anchor (in Germany)
Mateo Sanz Lanz (born 1993), Swiss sailor
Monica Lanz (born 1991), Dutch rower 
Otto Lanz (1865–1935), Swiss surgeon
Paula Lanz Blazquez (born 1996), Spanish racing cyclist
Pedro Luis Díaz Lanz (1926–2008), Chief of the Revolutionary Air Force of Cuba 
 Karl Lanz, German industrialist and airship manufacturer, see Schutte-Lanz  
 Rick Lanz (born 1961), Czech-Canadian hockey player
Víctor Manuel Méndez Lanz (born 1952), Mexican politician
Justin Lanz (born 1971), IT Specialist, Project Management

See also
Lantz (surname)
Lanz Pierce (born 1989), American rapper, singer, songwriter and producer